Huddersfield Town's 1930–31 campaign was a season that saw Town start a revival in form, which saw them finish in the top 5 thanks primarily to the emergence of 2 new striking talents, Joe Robson, who was bought from Grimsby Town following Alex Jackson's departure to Chelsea and Town's own young prodigy Dave Mangnall. The season is also noted for Town's biggest ever win in a league match, 10–1 over Blackpool in December.

Squad at the start of the season

Review
The previous 2 seasons were only memorable for Town's 4th appearance in an FA Cup Final. Luckily, Clem Stephenson was on hand to turn the tide of failure back to success. There was a slight hiccup early on the season, when Alex Jackson left Leeds Road for Chelsea, just 4 games into the season. He had already scored 7 goals during the season including a hat-trick in his last match, a 6-0 win over Manchester United at Old Trafford.

Joe Robson was brought in from Grimsby Town and he started Town's push for Championship supremacy along with Town youngster Dave Mangnall, who between them scored 27 goals in the 35 league games that they started between them. Their form continued to improve during the season, which saw them finish in 5th place, but they were 18 points behind leaders Arsenal.

Squad at the end of the season

Results

Division One

FA Cup

Appearances and goals

Huddersfield Town A.F.C. seasons
Huddersfield Town F.C.